Murie may refer to:

People
 Murie family of American naturalists, including:
 Olaus Murie (1889–1963)
 Adolph Murie (1899–1974)
 Margaret Murie (1902–2003)
 Louise Murie (1912–2012)
 David Murie (b. 1976) Scottish footballer

Other
 Murie Ranch Historic District inholding in Grand Teton National Park
 Murie Residence
 Murie Science and Learning Center
 Murie railway station on the Walhalla narrow gauge line in Gippsland, Victoria, Australia

Similar spellings
 Mury (disambiguation)
 Muir (disambiguation)